Cormac is a masculine given name in the Irish and English languages. The name is ancient in the Irish language and is also seen in the rendered Old Norse as Kormákr.

Mac is Irish for "son", and can be used as either a prefix or a suffix.   The derivation of "cor" is not so clear.  The most popular speculation is that it is from "corb," the old Irish for wheel, perhaps designating someone who fought in a cart or chariot as male names are often derived from order of battle.  (For instance "Gary, Garth, etc., from "gar" for "spear.")  However, some etymologies suggest it derives from the old Irish for "raven", a bird laden with mystical meaning for the Celts, and often used to mean "legend" or "legendary".  Similarly, it might refer specifically to Corb, one of the legendary Fomorians of Irish mythology. Today the name is typically listed in baby names books as meaning "raven" or "legend" or sometimes as "charioteer".

People with the name

Cormac
Cormac Mac Airt, semi-historical High King of Ireland, Ruler of Tara ca. 227-266
Cormac Cond Longas, exiled prince of Ulster from Irish mythology
Cormac of Armagh (c.430 - 17 February 497), Archbishop of Armagh diocese and Abbot of Armagh monastery, Ireland from 481 to 17 February 497
Cormac mac Cuilennáin, ninth-century bishop and king
Cormac of Dunkeld ca. 1114–1131, Bishop of Dunkeld
Cormac Mac Carthaigh, Bishop and King of Cashel, ? -1388
Cormac Láidir MacCarthy (1411-1494), Irish Chieftain, discoverer of the Blarney Stone and builder of Blarney Castle.
Cormac McCarthy, American novelist
Cormac Breslin, Irish politician
Cormac Murphy-O'Connor, Cardinal and Archbishop of Westminster
Cormac Antram (1926-2013), also known as Father Cormac, American priest and expert on the Navajo language
Cormac Costello, Gaelic football player
Cormac Ua Liatháin, Irish saint
Kormákr
Kormákr Ögmundarson the skald, hero of Kormáks saga

See also
List of Irish-language given names
Cormack (surname)
McCormack

References

English-language masculine given names
Irish-language masculine given names